René Berlingeri (born 15 October 1946) is a Puerto Rican sports shooter. He competed in the mixed skeet event at the 1976 Summer Olympics.

References

External links
 

1946 births
Living people
Puerto Rican male sport shooters
Olympic shooters of Puerto Rico
Shooters at the 1976 Summer Olympics
Place of birth missing (living people)